The Greatest Songs and More (Great Box) is a 4-CD box set by 10cc released in Japan in June 1991. The compilation includes singles, album tracks, and rare b-sides recorded between 1972 and 1983. Many of the tracks included were unavailable on CD elsewhere until re-issues of their later albums were released—also in Japan—in 2006. It is not known how many copies were produced, but over the years it has commanded high prices on the collectors market.

Track listing
CD ONE
 "Donna" (Kevin Godley/Lol Creme) – 2:56++ 1972
 "Rubber Bullets" (Godley/Creme/Graham Gouldman) – 4:41++ 1973
 "The Dean and I" (Godley/Creme) – 2:52++ 1973
 "The Wall Street Shuffle" (Eric Stewart/Gouldman) – 3:51 1974
 "Silly Love" (Creme/Stewart) – 3:14 1974
 "Life is a Minestrone" (Creme/Stewart) – 4:41 1975
 "Channel Swimmer" (Godley/Gouldman) – 4:48+ 1975
 "I'm Not in Love" (Stewart/Gouldman) – 6:02 1975
 "Good News" (Godley/Creme) – 3:45+ 1975
 "The Second Sitting for the Last Supper" (Godley/Creme/Stewart/Gouldman) – 4:22 1975
 "Blackmail" (Stewart/Gouldman) – 4:26 1975
 "Une Nuit A Paris" (Godley/Creme) – 8:38 1975
 "The Film of My Love" (Godley/Creme) – 5:01 1975

CD TWO
 "Art for Art's Sake" (Stewart/Gouldman) – 5:59 1975
 "Get It While You Can" (Stewart/Gouldman) – 2:54+ 1975
 "I'm Mandy Fly Me" (Stewart/Gouldman/Godley) – 5:20 1976
 "I Wanna Rule the World" (Godley/Creme/Gouldman) – 3:56 1976
 "Rock and Roll Lullaby" (Stewart/Gouldman) – 3:58 1976
 "Don't Hang Up" (Godley/Creme) – 6:18 1976
 "The Things We Do for Love" (Stewart/Gouldman) – 3:28 1976
 "Hot to Trot" (Stewart/Gouldman) – 4:26+ 1976
 "Good Morning Judge" (Stewart/Gouldman) – 2:53 1977
 "Don't Squeeze me like Toothpaste" (Stewart/Gouldman) – 3:41+ 1977
 "People in Love" (Stewart/Gouldman) – 3:44 1977
 "I'm So Laid Back, I'm Laid Out" (Stewart/Gouldman) – 3:45+ 1977
 "Marriage Bureau Rendezvous" (Stewart/Gouldman) – 4:03 1977
 "Honeymoon with B Troop" (Stewart/Gouldman) – 2:45 1977
 "I Bought a Flat Guitar Tutor" (Stewart/Gouldman) – 1:45 1977

CD THREE
 "The Things We Do for Love - Live" (Stewart/Gouldman) – 3:44 1977
 "Ships Don't Disappear in the Night (Do They?) - Live” (Stewart/Gouldman) – 7:36 1977
 "I'm Mandy Fly Me - Live" (Stewart/Gouldman/Godley) – 5:26 1977
 "Waterfall - Live" (Stewart/Gouldman) – 7:25 1977
 "Dreadlock Holiday" (Stewart/Gouldman) – 4:29 1978
 "Nothing Can Move Me" (Stewart/Gouldman) – 4:03+ 1978
 "Reds in My Bed" (Stewart/Tosh) – 4:08 1978
 "Take These Chains" (Stewart/Gouldman) – 2:36 1978
 "For You and I" (Stewart/Gouldman) – 5:18 1978
 "From Rochdale to Ocho Rios" (Gouldman) – 3:42 1978
 "One-Two-Five" (Stewart/Gouldman) – 5:10 1980
 "Only Child" (Stewart/Gouldman) – 3:14+ 1980
 "It Doesn't Matter at All" (Stewart/Gouldman) – 4.00 1980
 "I Hate to Eat Alone" (Gouldman) – 2:54 1980

CD FOUR
 "Les Nouveau Riches" (Stewart) – 5:09 1981
 "Don't Turn Me Away" (Stewart) – 5:00 1981
 "Tomorrows World Today" (Gouldman) – 3:13+ 1981
 "Memories" (Stewart/Gouldman) – 4:26 1981
 "The Power of Love" (Stewart/Gouldman/Gold) – 4:13 1982
 "You're Coming Home Again" (Stewart) – 4:27+ 1982
 "Run Away" (Stewart/Gouldman/Gold) – 4:02 1982
 "Action Man in Motown Suit" (Stewart/Gouldman) – 4:45 1981
 "We've Heard It All Before" (Stewart/Gouldman/Gold) – 3:35 1982
 "Overdraft in Overdrive" (Stewart/Gouldman) – 3:22 1981
 "24 Hours" (Stewart/Gouldman) – 7:26 1983
 "Feel the Love (Oomachasaooma)" (Stewart/Gouldman) – 5:09 1983
 "She Gives Me Pain" (Stewart/Gouldman) – 2:15+ 1983
 ”I'm Not in Love - Live" (Stewart/Gouldman) – 6:05 1977

All the tracks are album versions except:
++ Single Edit
+ B-Side

Notes

The box set left several other "officially released" tracks/versions that hadn't been issued on CD:
 "One Two Five" (Single Version)+
 "Les Nouveau Riches" (Single Version)++
 "Memories" (US Version)++
 "I'm Not in Love - Live" (b-side of "24 Hours")+++
 "Dreadlock Holiday - Live" (b-side of "24 Hours")+++
 "24 Hours" (Single Edit)+++
 "Feel the Love" (Single Edit)+++
 "The Secret Life of Henry" (b-side of Dutch single "Food for Thought")+++
 "Food for Thought" (Single Edit)+++

These have since been released on:
+ Look Hear? (2006 Japan Re-issue)
++ Ten Out of 10 (2006 Japan Re-issue)
+++ Windows in the Jungle (2006 Japan Re-issue)

References

10cc albums
1991 compilation albums